The 28th Commonwealth Infantry Brigade was a Commonwealth formation of the 1st Commonwealth Division that served in Korea from 1952 to 1954.

History
The Brigade was constituted from the UK 28th Infantry Brigade, which had arrived in Hong Kong from the United Kingdom in 1949, to join the 40th Infantry Division. Formed in Korea in April 1951, it took the title '28th Commonwealth Brigade' replacing 27th Commonwealth Brigade in the 1st Commonwealth Division, and served right through the war, until leaving in 1954. It comprised two British and two Australian infantry battalions and 16th Field Regiment, Royal New Zealand Artillery.

Commanders
Command of the brigade was shared by Australia and the United Kingdom.

Order of battle

UK Units
1st Battalion, King's Own Scottish Borderers, July 1951 – August 1952
1st Battalion, King's Shropshire Light Infantry, July 1951 – September 1952
1st Battalion, Royal Fusiliers, August 1952 – July 1953
1st Battalion, Durham Light Infantry, September 1952 – July 1953

Australian Units
3rd Battalion, Royal Australian Regiment (3 RAR), September 1950 – July 1953
1st Battalion, Royal Australian Regiment (1 RAR), June 1952 – March 1953
2nd Battalion, Royal Australian Regiment (2 RAR), April 1953 – July 1953

New Zealand Units
16th Field Regiment, Royal New Zealand Artillery, April 1951 – 1954

References

1951 establishments in the United Kingdom
Military alliances involving Australia
Military alliances involving New Zealand
Military alliances involving the United Kingdom
20th-century military alliances
Military units and formations established in 1951
Military units and formations disestablished in 1954
Brigades of the Korean War
British Commonwealth units and formations
Infantry brigades of New Zealand